Washington School, also known as the Head Start Building, is a historic school building located at Monroe City, Monroe County, Missouri, USA. It was built in 1937 and is a one-story, "T"-shaped, Colonial Revival style brick building. It housed three classrooms for the education of the African-American students of Monroe City. It was listed on the National Register of Historic Places in 1994.  

Also on the property are the contributing the flagpole which was erected at the same time as the building, and a merry-go-round from the same period.

References

African-American history of Missouri
School buildings on the National Register of Historic Places in Missouri
Colonial Revival architecture in Missouri
School buildings completed in 1937
Schools in Monroe County, Missouri
National Register of Historic Places in Monroe County, Missouri